The Niigata Nisai Stakes (Japanese 新潟2歳ステークス) is a Grade 3 horse race for two-year-old Thoroughbreds run in August over a distance of 1600 metres at Niigata Racecourse.

The race was first run in 1981 and was promoted to Grade 3 status in 1984. Originally run over 1200 metres the race was increased in distance to 1400 metres 1997 and to its current distance in 2002. It was run over 1200 metres at Nakayama Racecourse in 1996 and 2000.

Winners since 2000

Earlier winners

 1984 - Dyna Shoot
 1985 - Dyna Acorn
 1986 - Cool Heart
 1987 - Green Molly
 1988 - Meiner Mut
 1989 - Daikatsu Ryusei
 1990 - Big Fight
 1991 - Uto Jane
 1992 - Pegasus
 1993 - Excellence Robin
 1994 - Tosho Phenoma
 1995 - Tayasu Da Vinci
 1996 - Personality One
 1997 - Courir Cyclone
 1998 - Rosado
 1999 - Gaily Funky

See also
 Horse racing in Japan
 List of Japanese flat horse races

References

Turf races in Japan